William Kermit Jobko (October 7, 1935 – December 18, 2004) was an American football linebacker who played nine seasons in the National Football League for the Rams (1958–1962), the Minnesota Vikings (1963–1965) and the Atlanta Falcons (1966). He played college football at Ohio State.

Early years
He attended Bridgeport High School (OH). He accepted a football scholarship from Ohio State University, where he became a starter on the offensive line for the 1954 and 1957 national championship teams. In 1957, he received All-American and team's most valuable player honors.

Professional career
Jobko was selected by the Los Angeles Rams in the 7th round (80th overall) of the 1958 NFL Draft.

1966 was his last year as a linebacker because he developed high blood pressure and was forced to retire for health reasons.

Personal life
In 1968, he served as the Falcons' assistant linebackers coach under head coach Norb Heckerin. In 1969, he was hired as a Falcons college scout. From 1978 to 1989, he was the Falcons director of pro personnel.

Jobko died of an abdominal aortic aneurysm on December 18, 2004.

External links
 Bill Jobko, former NFL player and scout, dies at 69

1935 births
2004 deaths
People from Snellville, Georgia
Sportspeople from the Atlanta metropolitan area
Players of American football from Georgia (U.S. state)
American football linebackers
Ohio State Buckeyes football players
Los Angeles Rams players
Minnesota Vikings players
Atlanta Falcons players
People from Bridgeport, Ohio
Deaths from abdominal aortic aneurysm
Atlanta Falcons scouts
Atlanta Falcons coaches
Atlanta Falcons executives